Copella nigrofasciata is a species of fish in the splashing tetra family found in the upper Amazon basin, ranging from Manaus into the Ucayli River. They grow no more than a few centimeters.

References

External links
 

Fish of Brazil
Fish of Peru
Taxa named by Herman Meinken
Fish described in 1952
Lebiasinidae